Krishnan Nair Shantakumari Chithra (born 27 July 1963), credited as K. S. Chithra or Chithra, is an Indian playback singer and Carnatic musician. In a career spanning over four decades, she has recorded 25,000 songs in various Indian languages including Malayalam, Telugu, Tamil, Kannada, Hindi, Odia, Bengali, Punjabi, Gujarati, Tulu, Rajasthani, Urdu, Sanskrit, and Badaga as well as foreign languages such as Malay, Latin, Arabic, Sinhalese, English and French. She is also known for her extensive history of collaboration in the songs with Music Composers A.R. Rahman, Ilaiyaraja, Hamsalekha, M. M. Keeravani and with the playback singers KJ Yesudas and SP Balasubramaniyam over the years. She is regarded as a cultural icon of Kerala and is fondly called as the Melody Queen and  Nightingale of South India.

Chithra is a recipient of six National Film Awards, nine Filmfare Awards South and 36 different state film awards. She has won film awards from all the four south Indian states. She was awarded India's third highest civilian honor Padma Bhushan in 2021 and Padma Shri in 2005 for her valuable contributions towards the Indian musical fraternity. Chithra is the first Indian woman who was honored by the House of Commons, British Parliament, United Kingdom in 1997 and is the only singer from India who was honored by the Government of China at the Qinghai International Music and Water Festival in 2009. She is conferred with the highest honour of Rotary International, For the Sake of Honour award in 2001 and has received the MTV Video Music Award – International Viewer's Choice at the Metropolitan Opera House, New York in 2001. She received honorary doctorates from Sathyabama University in 2011 and from The International Tamil University, United States in 2018.

Hindi songs

Tamil songs

Telugu songs

Malayalam songs

Kannada songs

Bengali songs 
This is Incomplete list

Odia songs 
This is Incomplete list

Tulu songs

Punjabi songs

Rajasthani songs

English songs

Latin songs

Arabic songs

References

Chithra, K S